Erich Gutenberg (13 December 1897 in Herford – 22 May 1984 in Cologne) was an influential German economist.

He is considered the founder of modern German business studies after World War II. Gutenberg used microeconomy to explain the functioning of the enterprise. Therefore, he also developed a new production function. With a system of inputs and outputs under management control he explained how a firm could be efficient.

He received his Ph.D. from the University of Halle in 1921 and subsequently taught as a professor at the Friedrich Schiller University of Jena, the Johann Wolfgang Goethe University of Frankfurt am Main, and the University of Cologne.

References
 Ernst Klee: Das Personenlexikon zum Dritten Reich. Wer war was vor und nach 1945. Fischer Taschenbuch Verlag, Frankfurt am Main 2005, p. 211.

1897 births
1984 deaths
German economists
People from Herford
University of Halle alumni
Academic staff of the University of Jena
Academic staff of Goethe University Frankfurt
Academic staff of the University of Cologne
Academic staff of the University of Münster